Northwood High School (Northwood) is located in Silver Spring and is one of five high schools that are part of Montgomery Downcounty Consortium. Northwood offers a number of academies for students as well as a variety of sports and clubs. In 2018, Northwood's six academies include Montgomery Middle College (MC2); Music, Theater and Dance; Politics, Advocacy and Law; Technological, Environmental and System Sciences; Humanities, Arts and Media; and Finance, Accounting, Marketing and Education.

Northwood originally opened its doors in 1956. The school was closed after 29 years in 1985 due to changing demographics in the area. As the need for additional space for high school students grew in later years, the Montgomery County Public School System re-opened Northwood in 2004.

The principal was Mildred Charley-Greene. She was appointed principal to Northwood in 2013 and was named 2019 Principal of the Year by the Maryland Association of Secondary School Principals.

Northwood High School is located in unincorporated Montgomery County, Maryland, and is part of Montgomery County Public Schools. It is in the Kemp Mill census-designated place, and it has a Silver Spring postal address.

History
In order to  relieve overcrowding in local schools adjacent to major federal installations or defense projects, President Eisenhower signed Title 45 Public Law 81-874  "ASSISTANCE FOR SCHOOL CONSTRUCTION" with  $1,500,000 contributed to Montgomery County. It was decided to build a new high school along 30 Acres on Old Bladensburg Road (later known as University Blvd) in Silver Spring with planned opening in fall 1956. The 2 story brick, tile, and glass rambler cost $1,955,143, with a student population of 1425. At its dedication Arthur S. Adams, president of the American Council on Education, described the school as a "Magnificent Building" to a crowd of 1000 visitors. The Northwood area grew prior to construction. The new school became a combination junior / senior high school named Northwood Junior Senior High School with new principal Edward (Ted) A. Bartlett. Principal Bartlett was Harvard educated, a World War II veteran, and the former basketball coach from Winchester High School in Winchester, Massachusetts.

At the start of school September 1956, there was no working bell system, no mirrors in the wash rooms, no lockers, no cafeteria. They used whistles to mark start-stop of class periods.

On February 1, 1960 Harold R. Packard replaced Bartlett. Eugene R. Smoley became Principal in 1972.  In 1977 Principal Bobby J. Mullis replaced Smoley, and retired at the 1985 closing.

Closing
The closing of Northwood High School was discussed and voted on 3 times by the Montgomery County School Board starting in 1981 and finally ordered closed in a contested decision that aimed to alleviate the concentration of minorities enrolling at Montgomery Blair High School. A nonprofit group, Northwood Community Solidarity Inc, was established to fight the closure.  After the closing, school trophies were given to students, and alumni. The varsity uniforms were sold to students for $1. The Northwood Indian headdress was donated to Wheaton Library for display.

From 1987 to 2004, Northwood was used to hold students from other high schools during renovations. The school was re-opened in 2004 due to increasing population. During its original run, the school's mascot was the Indians. A September 2001 vote by the Board of Education banned ethnic and race-based team mascots at county schools. Students in the first class and Alumni from the 1958 first graduating class chose the Gladiators as the new mascot.

Reopening
Prior to the reopening the funds saved by the Northwood Community Solidarity for 20 years, $8,500, was donated to Northwood in memory of the late Bobby Mullis.

2008 was the first year since the school reopened in which there were all four classes. The school had approximately 1,400 students. This size has moved it from a division 2A school in Maryland High School athletics, to a division 3A school for the 2009-10 school year.

As of the 2019-20 school year, Northwood High School boasts over 1800 students from diverse backgrounds.

Bomb threat
On the morning of Tuesday, April 29, 2014, Northwood High School and Northwest High School in Germantown, Maryland were evacuated after a bomb threat. The Montgomery County Police Department (MCPD) received information about the threat at 9:30 a.m. (EDT) and searched the schools, finding no bombs, and deeming them to be safe at 10:51 a.m. (EDT).

Sports
In 2018, Northwood students participated in 45 teams across 18 sports for the fall, winter, and spring seasons. Students played on both varsity and junior varsity levels and hosted girl, boy, and co-ed teams. Sports included baseball, basketball, bocce, cross country, field hockey, football, golf, lacrosse, pom pom, racquetball, side cheer, soccer, softball, swimming, tennis, track, volleyball, and wrestling.

The school's sports program is only in their second season of having varsity teams. The varsity football squad earned a record of 5-5 and the varsity basketball team reached the regional playoffs. The boys soccer team has won the 3A/2A division championship for two consecutive years (2008, 2009). The boys Cross country running team has won the Montgomery County Public Schools division IV championship two consecutive years (2008, 2009). The boys cross-country team qualified to run in the state championships out of the 3A West region in 2009. In 2009 the girls Cross-Country team won the Montgomery County Public Schools division IV championship. In 2008 Northwood had three division 2A state champions in indoor track and one champion and runner-up in outdoor track. The varsity cheerleading squad placed second in their division in the December 2008 Montgomery County Public Schools competition. The varsity cheerleading squad placed first in their division and won spirit award in the November 2009 Montgomery County Public Schools competition

Prior to closing in 1985, Northwood had a number of division, county, regional, and state championships in a variety of sports.  Don Greenberg was an all county member of the football and baseball teams during the 1973 and 1974 seasons which are often referred to as the "glory years" of Northwood athletics.

School facilities
The schools location is at the north-east corner of University Boulevard West and Arcola Avenue in Silver Spring, Maryland. The school's architect, William N. Denton Jr., designed a classic H-shaped construction. The original school opened with 55 classrooms, 11 administrative offices, a large gym, and 108 seat library and cafeteria seating 456.  Before the end of the first year, plans were made to add an additional 14 new classrooms. Northwood has a recently remodeled multipurpose stadium where their football, soccer, track and lacrosse teams play, named after former Northwood Technology Education, (mostly Electronics) teacher David Kaplan who became an activist lobbying to keep the school open in 1985.  The athletic area of Northwood also includes two baseball fields, a track, and a concessions area to the left of the main stands of Kaplan Stadium. The school has a Media Center that mainly serves as a library. There is also a band room, alternate music room, a full wellness center, and a film room that is the location of Northwood's television and radio station, WNHS.

To address crowding in the Downcounty Consortium, an addition and facility upgrades are planned for the high school. This expansion includes additional classrooms, reconfiguration of existing spaces and upgrades to building systems. It will bring the total student capacity to 2,700 students, an increase of 1,200 seats.  During the upgrade, the school will operate out of the campus of Charles W. Woodward High School.  This upgrade is scheduled to be completed by September 2025.

WNHS
During the early 1970s, WNHS was a low-power AM radio station, used for broadcasting home football games.
WNHS became the television and radio station at Northwood high school.  Unique throughout the county to Northwood High School, WNHS performs a live news show broadcast to students and faculty for the first twenty minutes of every school day. The program also covers sporting and school-wide events, such as graduation and prom. Shortly after reopening, the program entered and won awards in video competitions.

Notable alumni
 Jonathan Banks, television and film actor
 Alex Bazzie, football player
Jerry Ceppos, journalist and academic
 George Daly, music executive (The Cars, Janis Joplin, The Tubes, Carlos Santana, Tool)
 Matt Drudge, Creator and editor of the Drudge Report.
Jan Rose Kasmir, Cultural Icon, subject of historic picture at 1967 March on the Pentagon
Annie Leibovitz, photographer (Class of 1967)
 George Pelecanos, author (detective and noir fiction), television producer and a television writer (The Wire)
 Evelyn Rosenberg, international artist and developer of the technique of Detonographics
Ryan Wetzel, film producer and tour manager
 Rick Young, Emmy Award Documentary Producer for Frontline

References

External links

 

Public high schools in Montgomery County, Maryland
1956 establishments in Maryland
1985 disestablishments in Maryland
2004 establishments in Maryland
Educational institutions established in 1956
Educational institutions disestablished in 1985
Educational institutions established in 2004
Kemp Mill, Maryland